The 2002–03 Wessex Football League was the 17th season of the Wessex Football League. The league champions for the first time in their history were Eastleigh, who were promoted to the Southern League. There was no relegation this season.

For sponsorship reasons, the league was known as the Jewson Wessex League.

League table
The league consisted of one division of 22 clubs, reduced from 23 the previous season, after Fleet Town were promoted to the Southern League, Swanage Town & Herston were relegated and one new club joined:
Alton Town, joining from the Hampshire League.

References

Wessex Football League seasons
8